Paratrechina vividula is a species of ant belonging to the family Formicidae.

It has cosmopolitan distribution.

References

Formicinae